Jess Hotter (born ) is a New Zealand big mountain skier who won the women's skiing Freeride World Tour title in 2022.

References

External links
Jess Hotter at Snow Sports NZ
Jess Hotter at freerideworldtour.com

1990s births
Living people
New Zealand female skiers
Extreme skiers
Freeskiers